José da Silva Maldonado d'Eça was a Portuguese colonial administrator. He was governor of the colony of Cape Verde from 19 June 1795 until his death on 10 September 1795. He succeeded Francisco José Teixeira Carneiro and was succeeded by Marcelino António Bastos. During his time as governor, the first cotton fields were planted in Cape Verde.

See also
List of colonial governors of Cape Verde

Notes

18th-century births
1795 deaths
Colonial heads of Cape Verde
Portuguese colonial governors and administrators